Rastislav Veselko (born 29 April 1988) is a Slovak professional ice hockey player who played with HC Slovan Bratislava in the Slovak Extraliga.

References

1988 births
Living people
HC Slovan Bratislava players
Slovak ice hockey defencemen
People from Šamorín
Sportspeople from the Trnava Region